35th Brigade or 35th Infantry Brigade may refer to:

Canada
 35 Canadian Brigade Group

India
 35th Indian Brigade of the British Indian Army in the First World War

Japan
 IJA 35th Independent Mixed Brigade

United Kingdom
 35th Anti-Aircraft Brigade (United Kingdom)
 35th Brigade (United Kingdom)
 Artillery Brigades
 35th Brigade Royal Field Artillery

United States
 35th Air Defense Artillery Brigade (United States)
 35th Combat Aviation Brigade (United States)
 35th Engineer Brigade (United States)
 35th Signal Brigade (United States)

See also
 35th Division
 35 Squadron